Huaiyin District is one of four districts of the prefecture-level city of Huai'an, Jiangsu Province, China.

Administrative divisions
In the present, Yanling County has 14 towns and 7 townships.
14 towns

7 townships

References

www.xzqh.org

External links 

County-level divisions of Jiangsu
Huai'an